Lido is a studio album by British singer and songwriter Darren Hayman. It was released through Where It's at Is Where You Are in 2012. The album is about public swimming pools.

Critical reception

Stuart Huggett of The Quietus wrote that "even as a diversion from his lyrically focussed work, Lido adds to the developing picture of Hayman as a great chronicler of British life, present and past." Clay Pipe of Record Collector wrote that "while navigating the stylistic gamut from pop-reggae to piano études, by way of uke strums and jelly-like slide guitar, Hayman forsakes ambient drift for recurring tunefulness, thus providing some continuity with his song-based work."

Track listing

References

2012 albums
Darren Hayman albums
Instrumental rock albums